Salvator Mundi (Jesus Christ, Saviour of the World) is a religious painting by Italian Renaissance artist Palma Vecchio, dated to  1518-1522. It is on display in the Musée des Beaux-Arts of Strasbourg, France. Its inventory number is 585.

The painting was bought in 1898 by Wilhelm von Bode, from a collection in Padua belonging to the estate of the Giustiniani and Barbarigo families. Bernard Berenson, and some other 20th-century art historians, disputed it, but it has been universally accepted since the 1992 publication of the monograph by Philip Rylands. 

The pose and the face of Jesus Christ are reminiscent of the slightly earlier Portrait of a Poet, now in the National Gallery. He is holding a transparent globe, almost invisible to the naked eye, and sitting in front of a green curtain opening on a landscape. This devotional work, executed in the manner of Venetian portrait painting, was very popular in its day; six copies or variations have survived (National Museum, Wrocław; Agnes Etherington Art Centre, Kingston; etc.).

References

External links

Salvator Mundi , presentation on the museum's website

Paintings by Palma Vecchio
Paintings in the collection of the Musée des Beaux-Arts de Strasbourg
1520s paintings
Renaissance paintings
Paintings depicting Jesus
Oil paintings